Unibórz  (German Tonnebuhr) is a village in the administrative district of Gmina Golczewo, within Kamień County, West Pomeranian Voivodeship, in north-western Poland. 

See also 

 History of Pomerania

References

Villages in Kamień County